The Homecoming of Odysseus (German: Die Heimkehr des Odysseus) may refer to:

 The Homecoming of Odysseus (1918 film), a German silent comedy film directed by Rudolf Biebrach
 The Homecoming of Odysseus (1922 film), a German silent historical film directed by Max Obal